The 1954–55 Swedish Division I season was the eleventh season of Swedish Division I. Djurgardens IF defeated Hammarby IF in the league final, 2 games to none.

Regular season

Northern Group

Southern Group

Final
Djurgårdens IF – Hammarby IF 6–3, 11–2

External links
 1954–55 season

Swe
Swedish Division I seasons
1954–55 in Swedish ice hockey